Trešnjevica may refer to the following places:

Bosnia and Herzegovina
Trešnjevica (Kalinovik)
Trešnjevica (Konjic)

Serbia
Trešnjevica (Arilje)
Trešnjevica (Paraćin)
Trešnjevica (Sjenica)